Kushkan (also Romanized as Kūshkan, Kowshkān, and Kūshkān; also known as Kūshgān, Kushkana, Kushkand, and Kūshkīn) is a village in Zanjanrud-e Bala Rural District, in the Central District of Zanjan County, Zanjan Province, Iran. At the 2006 census, its population was 445, in 109 families.

References 

Populated places in Zanjan County